Kahnuyeh (also Romanized as Kahnūyeh; also known as Hakku and Ḩakū) is a village in Seyfabad Rural District, in the Central District of Khonj County, Fars Province, Iran. At the 2006 census, its population was 1,073, in 194 families.

References 

Populated places in Khonj County